is a Japanese fashion model, tarento and actress.

Rinka is represented with Stardust Promotion. She graduated from Tokyo Girls' School Junior High and High School. Rinka also attended a dental hygienist vocational school.

Awards

Filmography

TV dramas

Films

Variety programmes

Radio programmes

TV advertisements

Discography and works

Singles
As ※All out of print

As Rinka

Jewellery

Bibliography

Photo albums

Magazines

Essays

See also
hitomi (singer) – Rinka co-starred in hitomi Japanese girl collection 2005–Love.Music.Love Fashion–. Also, she talked about hitomi's photobook.

References

External links
 
 
 
 – Wayback Machine (archived 8 May 2016) – Rinka Design Jewellery jupiter Gold Label Official Mail order 

Japanese female models
Japanese television personalities
Stardust Promotion artists
Avex Group artists
Singers from Tokyo
Japanese people of French descent
Japanese people of Australian descent
1973 births
Living people
21st-century Japanese singers
21st-century Japanese women singers
Models from Tokyo Metropolis